Merikanto is a Finnish surname. It may refer to:
 Oskar Merikanto (1868–1924), Finnish composer
 Aarre Merikanto (1893–1958), his son, also a composer
 Ukri Merikanto (1950–2010), Aarre's son, sculptor

Surnames
Finnish-language surnames